The fennec fox (Vulpes zerda) is a small crepuscular fox native to the deserts of North Africa, ranging from Western Sahara and Morocco to the Sinai Peninsula. Its most distinctive feature is its unusually large ears, which serve to dissipate heat and listen for underground prey. The fennec is the smallest fox species. Its coat, ears, and kidney functions have adapted to the desert environment with high temperatures and little water. It mainly eats insects, small mammals and birds. The fennec has a life span of up to 14 years in captivity and about 10 years in the wild. Its main predators are the Verreaux's eagle-owl, jackals and other large mammals. Precise population figures are not known but are estimated from the frequency of sightings; these indicate that the fennec is currently not threatened by extinction. Knowledge of social interactions is limited to information gathered from captive animals. The fennec's fur is prized by the indigenous peoples of North Africa, and it is considered an exotic pet in some parts of the world. 

Its name comes from the species' Arabic name: fanak.

Description 

The fennec fox has sand-colored fur which reflects sunlight during the day and helps keep it warm at night. Its nose is black. Its tapering tail has a black tip. Its long ears have longitudinal reddish stripes on the back and are so densely haired inside that the external auditory meatus is not visible. The edges of the ears are whitish, but darker on the back. The ear to body ratio is the greatest in the canid family and likely helps in dissipating heat and locating vertebrates. It has dark streaks running from the inner eye to either side of the slender muzzle. Its large eyes are dark. The pads of its paws are covered with dense fur, which facilitates walking on hot, sandy soil.

The fennec fox is the smallest canid.

Distribution and habitat 
The fennec fox is distributed throughout the Sahara, from Morocco and Mauritania to northern Sudan, through Egypt and its Sinai Peninsula. It inhabits small sand dunes and vast treeless sand areas with sparse vegetation such as grasses, sedges and small shrubs.

Behaviour and ecology 

A fennec fox digs its den in sand, either in open areas or places sheltered by plants with stable sand dunes. In compacted soils, dens are up to  large, with up to 15 different entrances. In some cases, different families interconnect their dens, or locate them close together. In soft, looser sand, dens tend to be simpler with only one entrance leading to a single chamber.

Hunting and diet 
The fennec fox is an omnivore, feeding on small rodents, lizards, geckos, skinks, small birds and their eggs, insects, fruits, leaves, roots and also some tubers. It relies on the moisture content of prey, but drinks water when available.
It hunts alone and digs in the sand for small vertebrates and insects. Some individuals were observed to bury prey for later consumption and searching for food in the vicinity of human settlements.

In the Algerian Sahara, 114 scat samples were collected that contained more than 400 insects, plant fragments and date palm (Phoenix dactylifera) fruits, remains of birds, mammals, squamata and insects.

Reproduction 

Captive fennec foxes reach sexual maturity at around nine months and mate between January and April. They usually breed only once per year. The copulation tie lasts up to two hours and 45 minutes. Gestation usually lasts between 50 and 52 days, though sometimes up to 63 days. After mating, the male becomes very aggressive and protects the female, and provides her with food during pregnancy and lactation. Females give birth between March and June to a litter of one to four pups that open their eyes after 8 to 11 days. Both female and male care for the pups. They communicate by barking, purring, yapping and squeaking. Pups remain in the family even after a new litter is born. The pups are weaned at the age of 61 to 70 days.

The oldest captive male fennec fox was 14 years old, and the oldest female 13 years.

Diseases 
Captive fennec foxes are susceptible to canine distemper virus, displaying fever, mucopurulent ocular discharge, diarrhea, severe emaciation, seizures, generalized ataxia, severe dehydration, brain congestion, gastric ulcers and death. Stress because of capture and long-distance transportation are thought to be the causes.

Predators 
African horned owl species such as the Pharaoh eagle-owl prey on fennec fox pups. Anecdotal reports exist about caracals, jackals, and striped hyenas also preying on the fennec fox. But according to nomads, the fennec fox is fast and changes directions so well that even their Salukis are hardly ever able to capture it.

Threats
In North Africa, the fennec fox is commonly trapped for exhibition or sale to tourists. Expansion of permanent human settlements in southern Morocco caused its disappearance in these areas and restricted it to marginal areas.

In captivity 
The fennec fox is bred commercially as an exotic pet. Commercial breeders remove the pups from their mother to hand-raise them, as tame foxes are more valuable. A breeders' registry has been set up in the United States to avoid any problems associated with inbreeding.

Conservation 
The fennec fox is listed in CITES Appendix II; it is protected in Morocco and Western Sahara, Algeria, Tunisia and Egypt, where it has been documented in several protected areas.

Cultural depictions 

The fennec fox is the national animal of Algeria. It also serves as the nickname for the Algeria national football team "Les Fennecs".

References

External links 
 
 

Carnivorans of Africa
Carnivorans of Asia
Fauna of the Sahara
fennec fox
Mammals of North Africa
Mammals of the Middle East
Species endangered by the pet trade
Taxa named by Eberhard August Wilhelm von Zimmermann
fennec fox